Grupo Financiero Santander México, S.A.B. de C.V. is a Mexican banking group and a subsidiary of Spanish bank Banco Santander.

History
The Mexican banking group Grupo Financiero InverMexico was founded in 1991. In 1997, the group was renamed Grupo Financiero Santander Mexicano, after the group was acquired by Banco Santander. In 1998, the group merged with Grupo Financiero Santander Mexico. In 2000, the group merged with sister group Grupo Financiero Serfin. The group was renamed to Grupo Financiero Santander Serfin in 2001.

In 2003, Bank of America purchased 24.9% stake of the group from parent company Banco Santander of Spain. In 2006, the group renamed again as Grupo Financiero Santander, S.A. de C.V. and later that year as Grupo Financiero Santander, S.A.B. de C.V. (publicly traded variable capital corporation).

Subsidiaries

Banco Santander (México)
Banco Santander (México) S.A. was founded on November 16, 1932, under the name Banco Mexicano. In 1955 Sociedad Mexicana de Crédito Industrial (Banco Somex) purchased a controlling interests of the bank. In 1958 Banco Mexicano merged with Banco Español. In 1979 the bank changed its name to Banco Mexicano Somex. In 1982 banks were nationalized. In 1992 InverMexico acquired Banco Mexicano. In 1996 the group was acquired by Banco Santander. In 2001 the bank was renamed as Banco Santander Mexicano.

In 2004 Banco Santander Mexicano and Banca Serfin were merged to form Banco Santander Serfin. In 2008 it was renamed as Banco Santander (México).

Banca Serfin
In 1992 the bank was acquired by Operadora de Bolsa and Banco Santander in 2000. The bank became defunct after a merger with Banco Santander Mexicano in 2004.

References

External links

 Investors Relations

Banks of Mexico
Banco Santander
Mexican subsidiaries of foreign companies
Companies based in Mexico City
Banks established in 1991
1991 establishments in Mexico
Companies listed on the Mexican Stock Exchange
Companies listed on the New York Stock Exchange